JBoss may refer to:
 JBoss (company), a software development company
 JBoss Application Server (JBoss AS), a Java EE-based application server, now known as WildFly
 JBoss Enterprise Application Platform (JBoss EAP)

See also
 List of JBoss software